, commonly known as , is a book and magazine publisher based in Tokyo, Japan.

Nikkei BP is known well for its various magazines on segmentalized business and technology fields, and a direct-sales system of the magazines.

Major magazines and websites
, a weekly business magazine founded as a sister magazine of Business Week in 1969, website in English and Japanese.
, a semimonthly electronics industry magazine founded as a sister magazine of Electronics in 1971.
, a semimonthly enterprise computing magazine published since 1981.
, a semimonthly personal computer magazine published since 1983, website in Japanese.
, a monthly leading computer magazine founded as a sister magazine of Byte in 1984, and was ceased in 2005.
nikkeibp.jp, an integrated business and technology news website in Japanese.

Talent Power Ranking 
The  magazine has published the annual  since 2008, based on surveys conducted by the research company Architect, Inc. to measure the public recognition and interest of Japan's entertainers.

References

External links
Nikkei Business Publications corporate website

Book publishing companies in Tokyo
Magazine publishing companies in Tokyo
Nikkei Inc.
1969 establishments in Japan
Mass media in Tokyo